Epermenia isolexa is a moth in the family Epermeniidae. It was described by Edward Meyrick in 1931. It is found in India.

References

Epermeniidae
Moths described in 1931
Moths of Asia